Xinshi Subdistrict is a subdistrict of Linjiang, Jilin, People's Republic of China. , it has two residential communities and two villages under its administration.

See also
List of township-level divisions of Jilin

References

Baishan
Township-level divisions of Jilin